Trump is an unincorporated community in Baltimore County, Maryland, United States.

Notes

Unincorporated communities in Baltimore County, Maryland
Unincorporated communities in Maryland